Mohammad Shahzada Hossain (born September 10, 1986, in Rasai) is a Bangladeshi cricketer who plays first-class cricket for Rajshahi Division. He is a right-arm medium-fast bowler and has also represented the Bangladesh Cricket Board XI.

References

1986 births
Living people
Bangladeshi cricketers
Rajshahi Division cricketers
Abahani Limited cricketers
Dhaka Division cricketers